This is a list of Romanian football transfers for the 2021–22 winter transfer window. Only moves featuring 2021–22 Liga I are listed.

Liga I

Academica Clinceni

In:

Out:

Argeș Pitești

In:

Out:

Botoșani

In:

Out:

CFR Cluj

In:

Out:

Chindia Târgoviște

In:

Out:

Dinamo București

In:

Out:

Farul Constanța

In:

Out:

FC U Craiova

In:

Out:

FCSB

In:

Out:

Gaz Metan Mediaș

In:

Out:

Mioveni

In:

Out:

Rapid București

In:

Out:

Sepsi Sfântu Gheorghe

In:

Out:

Universitatea Craiova

In:

Out:

UTA Arad

In:

Out:

Voluntari

In:

Out:

References

Romania
Winter 2021-22